Raymond Anderson may refer to:

Raymond Cecil Anderson (born 1929), international affairs consultant and former Canadian diplomat
Raymond Elmer Anderson (1891–1970), Canadian politician and farmer

See also
Ray Anderson (disambiguation)